Kalam (Kalami, Pashto, & ) is a valley located  from Mingora in the northern upper section of Swat valley along the banks of the Swat River in the Khyber Pakhtunkhwa province of Pakistan. The Swat River was formed as a result of the confluence of two major tributaries, the Gabral and Ushu river. 

Climate
With a mild and generally warm and temperate climate, Kalam features a humid subtropical climate (Cfa) under the Köppen climate classification.

Lakes

Kalam has large number of alpine glacial lakes. Two notable lakes in the Kalam Valley are the Mahodand lake and Kundol lake, both of which are frequently visited due to their easy access routes. Other lakes in the region, such as Izmis lake, are harder to enter and need to be done so on foot.

Mahodand Lake is a large lake in the Swat Valley, located approximately 40 km from Kalam, in the Usho Sub-valley at the base of the Hindu Kush mountains.

Another notable lake in the Kalam Valley is the Kundol Lake located in the north of Utror region, 19 km away from Kalam. It is located at the base of the Hindu Kush mountains.

Gallery

See also
 Bahrain, Swat
 Kumrat Valley
 Mahodand Lake
 Swat Valley
 Kalam summer festival
 Tourism in Khyber Pakhtunkhwa

References

Hill stations in Pakistan
Swat District
Swat Kohistan
Populated places in Swat District
Tourist attractions in Swat
Valleys of Khyber Pakhtunkhwa